West Virginia Division of Forestry is a government agency of the U.S. state of West Virginia. It is a division of the West Virginia Department of Commerce. The West Virginia Division of Forestry is responsible for regulating and maintaining West Virginia's state forests and other state-controlled forest areas.

Facilities

State forests

References

External links
Official site
 Visit the WVDOF's Facebook Page

 
State agencies of West Virginia
State forestry agencies in the United States
State environmental protection agencies of the United States